The Palacio Vistalegre is a multipurpose arena located in Madrid, Spain. It was built on the site of the former bullring, "Plaza de toros de Vista Alegre", built in 1906 and demolished in 1995. The venue is composed of three main spaces: The Arena, The Centre and the Sala San Miguel (formerly known as The Box).

History 

In 1980, the original bullring closed, and the site stood empty until plans were unveiled in 1996 for the modern arena, which would also be capable of staging bullfights.

The arena was opened in 2000, offering a seating capacity of 14,000 and has 1,015 parking places.

See also
 List of indoor arenas in Spain

External links 

  
 World Stadiums

Indoor arenas in Spain
Basketball venues in Spain
Bullrings in Spain
Sports venues in Madrid
2000 establishments in Spain
Sports venues completed in 2000
Buildings and structures in Carabanchel District, Madrid